The 2016 BNP Paribas Masters was a professional men's tennis tournament played on indoor hard courts. It was the 44th edition of the tournament, and part of the World Tour Masters 1000 category of the 2016 ATP World Tour. It took place at the Palais omnisports de Paris-Bercy in Paris, France, between 29 October and 6 November 2016. Second-seeded Andy Murray won the singles title.

Points and prize money

Point distribution

Prize money

Singles main-draw entrants

Seeds

 1 Rankings are as of 24 October 2016

Other entrants
The following players received wildcards into the singles main draw:
  Adrian Mannarino
  Paul-Henri Mathieu
  Stéphane Robert

The following players received entry from the qualifying draw:
  Julien Benneteau 
  Robin Haase 
  Pierre-Hugues Herbert
  Dušan Lajović 
  Andreas Seppi 
  Jan-Lennard Struff

The following player received entry as a special exempt:
  Mischa Zverev

Withdrawals
Before the tournament
  Roger Federer (knee injury) →replaced by  Pablo Carreño Busta
  Nick Kyrgios (suspended) →replaced by  Fabio Fognini
  Gaël Monfils →replaced by  Guido Pella
  Rafael Nadal (wrist injury) →replaced by  Illya Marchenko
  Sam Querrey →replaced by  Nicolas Mahut
  Bernard Tomic →replaced by  Fernando Verdasco
  Alexander Zverev →replaced by  Nicolás Almagro

Doubles main-draw entrants

Seeds

 Rankings are as of 24 October 2016

Other entrants
The following pairs received wildcards into the doubles main draw:
  Jonathan Eysseric /  Tristan Lamasine
  Quentin Halys /  Adrian Mannarino

Finals

Singles

  Andy Murray defeated  John Isner, 6–3, 6–7(4–7), 6–4

Doubles

   Henri Kontinen /  John Peers defeated  Pierre-Hugues Herbert /  Nicolas Mahut, 6–4, 3–6, [10–6]

References

External links
 Official website
 ATP tournament profile